Susan Kathryn Hookham (née Rowan), known as Lama Shenpen Hookham is a Buddhist teacher who has trained for over 50 years in the Mahamudra and Dzogchen traditions of Tibetan Buddhism.

Biography

Lama Shenpen was born Susan Kathryn Rowan in Essex, England, in 1946. She first encountered Buddhism while studying Geography and Sociology at Reading University, where she became secretary of the University Buddhist Society and had early encounters with Sangharakshita and Chögyam Trungpa Rinpoche. amongst others.

In the early 1970s, on the advice of Chögyam Trungpa Rinpoche, Lama Shenpen went to India where she lived as a nun for six years, ordained by the 16th Karmapa. There she studied and meditated in retreat under the guidance of Tibetan teachers such as Karma Thinley Rinpoche, Bokar Rinpoche and Kalu Rinpoche. Rangjung Rigpe Dorje, the 16th Karmapa and head of the Kagyu tradition of Tibetan Buddhism, subsequently instructed her to return to the West to teach Mahamudra.

She met her main teacher, Khenpo Tsultrim Gyamtso Rinpoche, in Europe, and he encouraged her to teach and transmit Mahamudra, the innermost teachings of the Kagyu tradition. On her later return to England, she met and married Rigdzin Shikpo Rinpoche (Michael Hookham), an early pupil of Chögyam Trungpa Rinpoche and Dharma Director of the Longchen Foundation (formerly the Chöd Group) since its inception in 1975.

Lama Shenpen is fluent in Tibetan and was the translator for many Tibetan teachers, including Gendun Rinpoche.

In 2020 Lama Shenpen's autobiography 'Keeping the Dalai Lama Waiting & Other Stories - An English Woman's Journey to Becoming a Buddhist Lama' was published, which describes her introduction to Buddhism, her time in India with her teachers, and her path to becoming a lama. The book has had many recommendations from other esteemed teachers, including Khandro Rinpoche and Ringu Tulku Rinpoche.

Awakened Heart Sangha
Shenpen is the Spiritual Director of the Awakened Heart Sangha, and spends most of her time in semi-retreat at the Hermitage of the Awakened Heart (Fortress of Enlightenment - Changchub Dzong) her home and the retreat centre in North Wales, United Kingdom. She has students worldwide who are studying her Living the Awakened Heart Training, a structured learning programme in meditation, reflection and insight, devised especially for westerners, to transmit the most profound teachings of Mahamudra and Dzogchen in an accessible, experiential way. Regular teaching days, meditation and study retreats are held at the Hermitage. According to Shenpen,

Under Lama Shenpen's guidance, in 2011 the Awakened Heart Sangha built an Enlightenment stupa at the Fortress of Enlightenment (Changchub Dzong), the Hermitage at Ynys Graianog, Criccieth, Gwynedd, in North Wales containing a small stupa consecrated by Khenpo Tsultrim Gyamtso Rinpoche. Lama Phuntsok from Nepal directed the construction and came to consecrate it formally in October of that year.

Khenpo Rinpoche and Rigdzin Shikpo Rinpoche have subsequently encouraged Lama Shenpen to develop her teaching activity further, and she is the author of the distant learning (online and in person) teaching programme Living the Awakened Heart Training which includes the structured, experience-based courses  'Discovering the Heart of Buddhism' and 'Trusting the Heart of Buddhism'.

Works and translations
Works
 S. K. Hookham: 'Buddha Within, Tathagatagarbha Doctrine According to the Shentong Interpretation of the Ratnagotravibhaga', SUNY Press, (1991) 
 Lama Shenpen Hookham: 'There's More to Dying than Death, a Buddhist Perspective', Windhorse Publications (2006) 
Lama Shenpen Hookham: 'The Guru Principle: A Guide to the Teacher-Student Relationship in Buddhism', Shambhala Publications (2021) 
Editor
 Rigdzin Shikpo & Shenpen K. Hookham (ed): 'Openness Clarity Sensitivity', Longchen Foundation, Wisdom Books, (2000) 
Translations
 Khenpo Tsultrim Gyamtso Rinpoche, translated and arranged by Shenpen Hookham: 'Progressive Stages of Meditation on Emptiness', Zhyisil Chokyi Ghatsal Publications (2001)

References

External links
 Lama Shenpen Hookham - Buddha Within
Awakened Heart Sangha 
 Wisdom Books: 'Teaching Fish About Water – An Interview with Shenpen Hookham'
 Maurizio Viana: 'The Making of a Great Western Lama', The Pocket Road 
 The Chronicles of Chögyam Trungpa Rinpoche: 'A letter from Shenpen Hookham'

Lamas
Shentong
English Buddhists
Converts to Buddhism
Converts to Buddhism from Christianity
20th-century Buddhists
21st-century Buddhists